Gaurav Kumar (born 10 December 1997) is an Indian kabaddi player who currently plays for the UP Yoddha in VIVO Pro Kabaddi League and the India national kabaddi team.

Early life 
Gaurav Kumar was born in Bharapur Bhori village of Uttarakhand Haridwar district, where he started playing kabaddi.

References

External links
 UP Yoddha bio
 Gaurav Kumar Chaudhary at GlobalSportsArchive
 Gaurav Kumar Chaudhary at MyKhel

1997 births
Living people
Indian kabaddi players
Pro Kabaddi League players